Zobel is a German family name. It may occasionally appear as Zóbel in Spanish-language texts.

Notable people
 Benjamin Zobel, German painter
 Claudia Zobel, Filipino actress
 Craig Zobel, American film director and co-creator of Homestar Runner
 Enrique J. Zóbel, Filipino businessman
 Fernando Zóbel de Ayala, Filipino businessman
 Fernando Zóbel, Spanish Filipino artist
 Friedrich Zobel, Austrian military officer
 Hermann Zobel, Danish equestrian
 Hiller B. Zobel, US judge and author
 Jaime Augusto Zóbel de Ayala, Filipino businessman
 Jaime Zóbel, Filipino businessman
 Jan Zobel, American accountant, community organizer
 Joseph Zobel, Martinican author
 Marita Zóbel, Filipino actress
 Marius Zobel, German swimmer
 María Vallejo-Nágera Zobel, Spanish novelist
 Martin Zobel, Estonian plant ecologist
 Melchior Zobel von Giebelstadt, 16th century bishop
 Melissa Tantaquidgeon Zobel, US historian
 Otto Julius Zobel, early 20th century electrical filter inventor and researcher
 Peter Zobel, Danish businessman and equestrian
 Rainer Zobel, former German football (soccer) player and current coach
 Richard Zobel, US actor
 Rya Zobel, federal judge on the U.S. District Court for the District of Massachusetts

German-language surnames